Roosevelt Field is a shopping mall in Garden City, New York. It was designed by I. M. Pei and is the largest shopping mall on Long Island, in the state of New York, and the ninth largest shopping mall in the United States.

It is managed by Simon Property Group. It is the second most successful mall in the state.
The anchors of the 243-store mall are Bloomingdale's, JCPenney, Macy's, Nordstrom, Dick's Sporting Goods, and Neiman Marcus. Previous anchor stores were Gimbels (succeeded by Stern's), A&S, and Alexander's (succeeded by Bloomingdale's). The original anchor store was Macy's. Discount department store chain Century 21 was no longer expected to open in the former Bloomingdale’s Home Furniture in Spring 2021 because Century 21, on Thursday September 10, 2020, filed for Chapter 11 bankruptcy, as a result of insurance companies failing to financially support the chain during the COVID-19 pandemic. In its place, Primark has opened.

Location

The mall is adjacent to the Meadowbrook State Parkway, making it accessible from the Northern State Parkway and Southern State Parkway. It is a major hub of Nassau Inter-County Express, with several bus routes stopping in a terminal area near the southern parking structure.

It was constructed on the site of, and named for, Roosevelt Field, an airport and military airfield where Charles Lindbergh began his historic trans-Atlantic flight. At one time, a plaque at the north end of the mall (in the hall that now connects Dick's and JCPenney) marked the spot where Lindbergh took off. It was later moved near the Disney Store, but was removed in the mall's latest renovation.

History
As an airfield, the land served as the take-off site of many famous aviators such as Amelia Earhart and Wiley Post. Charles Lindbergh's solo transatlantic flight took off from Roosevelt Field in 1927. The field was originally named Hazelhurst Field and was renamed in honor of Theodore Roosevelt's son, Quentin, who died in World War I. After the airfield was closed in 1951, the site was developed by New York's William Zeckendorf and designed by I. M. Pei.

Ground was broken on the $35 million project in April 1955. The center opened with a single level and was an open-air center. It included a Woolworth five-and-dime store, a Walgreens drug store, a Food Fair supermarket, a Buster Brown shoe store, a public auditorium, a movie theater, and an outdoor ice rink. The original anchor of the mall was a 2-level 343,000 ft² (31,900 m²) Macy's, which opened on August 22, 1956.

In 1962, a 250,000 ft² (2,320 m²) Gimbels store opened. Today, the structure houses Dick's Sporting Goods and Bloomingdale's Furniture. With the addition, the complex held over 1,000,000 ft² (92,900 m²). A major extension was completed in 1964. Macy's had an 85,000 ft² (7,900 m²) third level added. In 1968, The Century Roosevelt Cinema began operation. At that time, the mall was enclosed.

In 1972, a second major expansion was completed which added a 3-level, 260,000 ft² (24,200 m²) J.C. Penney, which was later completely renovated in 2010, and a 2-level 314,000 ft² (2,900 m²) Alexander's. Le Petit Mall, a Tudor-style expansion was built in 1974 that architecturally reinforced the novelty of shopping indoors.

An upper level of stores and food court was established in 1993 after a major renovation which started in 1991. When Alexander's went bankrupt in 1992, Abraham & Straus gutted the building and extensively renovated it, opening in 1992. The Abraham & Straus location at Roosevelt Field only lasted until 1995, when the chain became defunct. The store was slightly renovated, and re-opened as a Bloomingdale's in 1995. The Bloomingdale's store at Roosevelt Field had a major renovation, which was finished by the summer of 2009. The former Gimbels anchor was a Stern's between 1987 and 2001.

After Stern's closed, the spot was taken over by Galyan's, which opened in 2003 (later bought out by Dick's Sporting Goods in 2004). Dick's Sporting Goods occupied the eastern section and Bloomingdale's Furniture Gallery, which opened in 2004, occupied the western half until closing in 2019. A new, 3-story Nordstrom and a 2-story wing leading to the new Nordstrom opened in August 1997. Simon Property Group took ownership of the mall when it acquired Corporate Property Investors in 1998.

In March 2012, it was announced that a new 100,000-square-foot building anchored by luxury department store Neiman Marcus would be added to Roosevelt Field. Opened on February 19, 2016, this expansion created room for even more shops leading up to the luxury department store and was accompanied by a new parking structure. During the renovation of the mall in 2015, the glass elevators in the center were removed to create a play area and new elevators were built to replace them. Simon had discovered that the scenic elevators had to be removed due to severe hydraulic oil leakage.

According to Newsday, on June 26, 2020, Microsoft announced they were closing their store with the rest of the Microsoft stores.

On September 10, 2020, it was announced that Century 21, which was going to open in the former Bloomingdale's Furniture Gallery space in 2021 would no longer be coming to the mall due to chain filing for bankruptcy and closing all 13 stores.

References

External links
Roosevelt Field (Official Site)

Simon Property Group
Shopping malls in Nassau County, New York
Hempstead, New York
Shopping malls established in 1956
Shopping malls in the New York metropolitan area
1956 establishments in New York (state)
I. M. Pei buildings